Daniel William O'Donoghue (October 15, 1876 – June 29, 1948) was an Associate Justice of the District Court of the United States for the District of Columbia.

Education and career

Born on October 15, 1876, in Washington, D.C., O'Donoghue received an Artium Baccalaureus degree in 1897, an Artium Magister degree in 1898 and a Doctor of Philosophy in 1899 from Georgetown University and received a Bachelor of Laws in 1899 and a Master of Laws in 1900 from Georgetown Law. He was in private practice in Washington, D.C. from 1900 to 1931. He was a faculty member at Georgetown Law from 1904 to 1934.

Federal judicial service

O'Donoghue received a recess appointment from President Herbert Hoover on October 28, 1931, to an Associate Justice seat on the Supreme Court of the District of Columbia (Associate Justice of the District Court of the United States for the District of Columbia from June 25, 1936, Judge of the United States District Court for the District of Columbia from June 25, 1948) vacated by Associate Justice Frederick Lincoln Siddons. He was nominated to the same position by President Hoover on December 15, 1931. He was confirmed by the United States Senate on January 26, 1932, and received his commission on February 23, 1932. He assumed senior status on October 31, 1946. His service terminated on June 29, 1948, due to his death.

References

Sources
 

1876 births
1948 deaths
Judges of the United States District Court for the District of Columbia
United States district court judges appointed by Herbert Hoover
20th-century American judges
People from Washington, D.C.
Georgetown University alumni
Georgetown University Law Center alumni
Georgetown University Law Center faculty